Pukekohe High School is a high school in Pukekohe in the Auckland Region of New Zealand.

House system

There are five Houses at Pukekohe High School, which are:

Day House named after Dr. Paul Day who became an Honorary Doctor at the University of Waikato in 1998. Day is the only former student of the school to have a house named after him. Day was also Dux in 1933, a Jellicoe House Leader [Day house having not have been established yet] and head boy in 1933 and 1934. He also served in World War II, his name is on the Honours Board at Puni School to remember those who served for King and Country during World War II, he is also on the honours board by the printing office at Pukekohe High School. Day died in 2008.

Massey House named after The Right Honourable William Ferguson Massey who was the second longest serving Prime Minister of New Zealand after Richard John Seddon. He was also a Member of Parliament for Franklin.

Blake House named after sailor and conservationist Sir Peter Blake. Blake received an Honorary Doctorate from Auckland University of Technology in 2000. Blake died in 2001 when he was murdered by pirates while monitoring environmental change in the Amazon River in Brazil.

Jellicoe House named after Admiral of the Fleet John Rushworth Jellicoe 1st Earl Jellicoe (GCB, OM, GCVO) commonly known as Lord Jellicoe who was the Royal Navy commander of the Grand Fleet of the Battle of Jutland in World War I. He was also a former Governor-General of New Zealand from 1920 to 1924, he also held a number of Military Offices including 1st Sea Lord 1916–1917, 2nd Sea Lord 1912–1914, and 3rd Sea Lord 1908–1910. He was also created the Earl Jellicoe in 1925 and Viscount Jellicoe in 1917. He was appointed a Knight Grand Cross of the Most Honorable Order of the Bath, and a Knight Grand Cross of the Royal Victorian Order, and was also awarded the Order of Merit. Jellicoe died in 1935.

Perkins House named after Mr. Frank Perkins Esq. a founding member of Pukekohe Technical High School (now Pukekohe High School) and also the first chairman of the board of governors of Pukekohe Technical High School.

Notable staff
 Tui Flower, food writer
 Merv Wellington, politician

Notable alumni

 Mike Brewer, rugby union player
 Rod Ketels, rugby union player
 Eric Murray, rower
 Geoffrey Sim, politician

References

External links
Pukekohe High School
Education Review Office Report 2009

Secondary schools in Auckland
Educational institutions established in 1921
1921 establishments in New Zealand